The Top Christian Albums chart is a record chart compiled by Billboard magazine, ranking the week's best-performing Christian albums in the United States. Like the Billboard 200, the data is compiled by Nielsen Soundscan based on each album's weekly physical and digital sales, as well as on-demand streaming and digital sales of its individual tracks.

During the decade, 204 albums reached the top of the chart. Lauren Daigle was the most-successful artist of the decade. Three albums by her topped the chart for 71 weeks during the 2010s. Look Up Child (2018) topped the year end charts of 2018 and 2019, while How Can It Be (2015) was the most successful album of the decade.

Number-ones

Statistics
The following artists have spent at least ten weeks atop the chart, with at least three albums:

The following albums have spent at least ten weeks atop the chart throughout the decade:

See also
 List of Billboard Christian Songs number ones of the 2010s

References
Notes

Footnotes

Christian Albums 2010s
United States Christian
Contemporary Christian Albums